The Minister of Home Affairs (or simply, the Home Minister, short-form HM) is the head of Ministry of Home Affairs of the Government of Andhra Pradesh. One of the senior-most officers in the Cabinet of Andhra Pradesh, the chief responsibility of the Home Minister is the maintenance of Andhra Pradesh's internal security; the state's police force comes under its jurisdiction. Occasionally, they are assisted by the Minister of State of Home Affairs.

Ever since the time of formation of Andhra Pradesh. the office has been seen as second in seniority with par to FRinacen minister only to the Chief Minister in the state Cabinet. Several Home Ministers have since held the additional portfolio of Deputy Chief Minister. 

From June 2014 to May 2019, the Home Minister of Andhra Pradesh was Nimmakayala Chinarajappa of the Telugu Desam Party, taking over the reins from Kiran Kumar Reddy who was also Home Minister as well as last Chief minister of Andhra Pradesh before burification of state into Andhra Pradesh and Telangana.  Following the cabinet re-shuffling on 11 April 2022, Taneti Vanitha assumed the office under Y. S. Jagan Mohan Reddy ministry.

List of Home Ministers

References

External links
Pradesh/story/amit-shah-home-minister-rajnath-finance-minister-new-list-of-cabinet-ministers-in-modi-govt-1539264-2019-05-31 Amit Shah take charge of Home Ministry of Andhra Pradesh 2019

Ministers of Internal Affairs by country